Conanthalictus is a genus of sweat bees in the family Halictidae. There are about 13 described species in Conanthalictus.

Species
 Conanthalictus bakeri Crawford, 1907
 Conanthalictus caerulescens Timberlake, 1961
 Conanthalictus cockerelli Timberlake, 1961
 Conanthalictus conanthi (Cockerell, 1901)
 Conanthalictus cotullensis Crawford, 1907
 Conanthalictus deserticola Timberlake, 1961
 Conanthalictus macrops Cockerell, 1916
 Conanthalictus mentzeliae Timberlake, 1961
 Conanthalictus minor Timberlake, 1961
 Conanthalictus namatophilus Timberlake, 1961
 Conanthalictus nigricans Timberlake, 1961
 Conanthalictus seminiger Michener, 1937
 Conanthalictus wilmattae Cockerell, 1936

References

 Michener, Charles D. (2000). The Bees of the World, xiv + 913.
 Michener, Charles D. (2007). The Bees of the World, Second Edition, xvi + 953.

Further reading

 

Halictidae